The King James Version (KJV), also the King James Bible (KJB) and the Authorized Version, is an Early Modern English translation of the Christian Bible for the Church of England, which was commissioned in 1604 and published in 1611, by sponsorship of King James VI and I. The 80 books of the King James Version include 39 books of the Old Testament, an intertestamental section containing 14 books of what most Protestants consider the Apocrypha, and the 27 books of the New Testament. Noted for its "majesty of style", the King James Version has been described as one of the most important books in English culture and a driving force in the shaping of the English-speaking world.

The KJV was first printed by John Norton and Robert Barker, who both held the post of the King's Printer, and was the third translation into English language approved by the English Church authorities: The first had been the Great Bible, commissioned in the reign of King Henry VIII (1535), and the second had been the Bishops' Bible, commissioned in the reign of Queen Elizabeth I (1568). In Geneva, Switzerland, the first generation of Protestant Reformers had produced the Geneva Bible of 1560 from the original Hebrew and Greek scriptures, which was influential in the writing of the Authorized King James Version.

In January 1604, King James convened the Hampton Court Conference, where a new English version was conceived in response to the problems of the earlier translations perceived by the Puritans, a faction of the Church of England.

James gave the translators instructions intended to ensure that the new version would conform to the ecclesiology, and reflect the episcopal structure, of the Church of England and its belief in an ordained clergy. The translation was done by 6 panels of translators (47 men in all, most of whom were leading biblical scholars in England) who had the work divided up between them: the Old Testament was entrusted to three panels, the New Testament to two, and the Apocrypha to one. In common with most other translations of the period, the New Testament was translated from Greek, the Old Testament from Hebrew and Aramaic, and the Apocrypha from Greek and Latin. In the 1662 Book of Common Prayer, the text of the Authorized Version replaced the text of the Great Bible for Epistle and Gospel readings (but not for the Psalter, which substantially retained Coverdale's Great Bible version), and as such was authorized by Act of Parliament.

By the first half of the 18th century, the Authorized Version had become effectively unchallenged as the English translation used in Anglican and other English Protestant churches, except for the Psalms and some short passages in the Book of Common Prayer of the Church of England. Over the course of the 18th century, the Authorized Version supplanted the Latin Vulgate as the standard version of scripture for English-speaking scholars. With the development of stereotype printing at the beginning of the 19th century, this version of the Bible had become the most widely printed book in history, almost all such printings presenting the standard text of 1769 extensively re-edited by Benjamin Blayney at Oxford, and nearly always omitting the books of the Apocrypha. Today the unqualified title "King James Version" usually indicates this Oxford standard text.

Name

The title of the first edition of the translation, in Early Modern English, was "THE HOLY BIBLE, Conteyning the Old Teſtament, AND THE NEW: Newly Tranſlated out of the Originall tongues: & with the former Tranſlations diligently compared and reuiſed, by his Maiesties ſpeciall Cõmandement". The title page carries the words "Appointed to be read in Churches", and F. F. Bruce suggests it was "probably authorised by order in council", but no record of the authorisation survives "because the Privy Council registers from 1600 to 1613 were destroyed by fire in January 1618/19".

For many years it was common not to give the translation any specific name. In his Leviathan of 1651, Thomas Hobbes referred to it as "the English Translation made in the beginning of the Reign of King James". A 1761 "Brief Account of the various Translations of the Bible into English" refers to the 1611 version merely as "a new, compleat, and more accurate Translation", despite referring to the Great Bible by its name, and despite using the name "Rhemish Testament" for the Douay–Rheims Bible version. Similarly, a "History of England", whose fifth edition was published in 1775, writes merely that "[a] new translation of the Bible, viz., that now in Use, was begun in 1607, and published in 1611".

King James's Bible is used as the name for the 1611 translation (on a par with the Genevan Bible or the Rhemish Testament) in Charles Butler's Horae Biblicae (first published 1797). Other works from the early 19th century confirm the widespread use of this name on both sides of the Atlantic: it is found both in a "historical sketch of the English translations of the Bible" published in Massachusetts in 1815 and in an English publication from 1818, which explicitly states that the 1611 version is "generally known by the name of King James's Bible". This name was also found as King James' Bible (without the final "s"): for example in a book review from 1811. The phrase "King James's Bible" is used as far back as 1715, although in this case it is not clear whether this is a name or merely a description.

The use of Authorized Version, capitalized and used as a name, is found as early as 1814. For some time before this, descriptive phrases such as "our present, and only publicly authorised version" (1783), "our Authorized version" (1731, 1792) and "the authorized version" (1801, uncapitalized) are found. A more common appellation in the 17th and 18th centuries was "our English translation" or "our English version", as can be seen by searching one or other of the major online archives of printed books. In Britain, the 1611 translation is generally known as the "Authorized Version" today. The term is somewhat of a misnomer because the text itself was never formally "authorized", nor were English parish churches ever ordered to procure copies of it.

King James' Version, evidently a descriptive phrase, is found being used as early as 1814. "The King James Version" is found, unequivocally used as a name, in a letter from 1855. The next year King James Bible, with no possessive, appears as a name in a Scottish source. In the United States, the "1611 translation" (actually editions following the standard text of 1769, see below) is generally known as the King James Version today.

History

Earlier English translations

The followers of John Wycliffe undertook the first complete English translations of the Christian scriptures in the 14th century. These translations were banned in 1409 due to their association with the Lollards. The Wycliffe Bible pre-dated the printing press but it was circulated very widely in manuscript form, often inscribed with a date which was earlier than 1409 in order to avoid the legal ban. Because the text of the various versions of the Wycliffe Bible was translated from the Latin Vulgate, and because it also contained no heterodox readings, the ecclesiastical authorities had no practical way to distinguish the banned version; consequently, many Catholic commentators of the 15th and 16th centuries (such as Thomas More) took these manuscripts of English Bibles and claimed that they represented an anonymous earlier orthodox translation.

In 1525, William Tyndale, an English contemporary of Martin Luther, undertook a translation of the New Testament. Tyndale's translation was the first printed Bible in English. Over the next ten years, Tyndale revised his New Testament in the light of rapidly advancing biblical scholarship, and embarked on a translation of the Old Testament. Despite some controversial translation choices, and in spite of Tyndale's execution on charges of heresy for having made the translated Bible, the merits of Tyndale's work and prose style made his translation the ultimate basis for all subsequent renditions into Early Modern English. With these translations lightly edited and adapted by Myles Coverdale, in 1539, Tyndale's New Testament and his incomplete work on the Old Testament became the basis for the Great Bible. This was the first "authorised version" issued by the Church of England during the reign of King Henry VIII. When Mary I succeeded to the throne in 1553, she returned the Church of England to the communion of the Catholic faith and many English religious reformers fled the country, some establishing an English-speaking colony at Geneva. Under the leadership of John Calvin, Geneva became the chief international centre of Reformed Protestantism and Latin biblical scholarship.

These English expatriates undertook a translation that became known as the Geneva Bible. This translation, dated to 1560, was a revision of Tyndale's Bible and the Great Bible on the basis of the original languages. Soon after Elizabeth I took the throne in 1558, the flaws of both the Great Bible and the Geneva Bible (namely, that the Geneva Bible did not "conform to the ecclesiology and reflect the episcopal structure of the Church of England and its beliefs about an ordained clergy") became painfully apparent. In 1568, the Church of England responded with the Bishops' Bible, a revision of the Great Bible in the light of the Geneva version. While officially approved, this new version failed to displace the Geneva translation as the most popular English Bible of the age—in part because the full Bible was only printed in lectern editions of prodigious size and at a cost of several pounds. Accordingly, Elizabethan lay people overwhelmingly read the Bible in the Geneva Version—small editions were available at a relatively low cost. At the same time, there was a substantial clandestine importation of the rival Douay–Rheims New Testament of 1582, undertaken by exiled Catholics. This translation, though still derived from Tyndale, claimed to represent the text of the Latin Vulgate.

In May 1601, King James VI of Scotland attended the General Assembly of the Church of Scotland at St Columba's Church in Burntisland, Fife, at which proposals were put forward for a new translation of the Bible into English. Two years later, he ascended to the throne of England as James I.

Considerations for a new version
The newly crowned King James convened the Hampton Court Conference in 1604. That gathering proposed a new English version in response to the perceived problems of earlier translations as detected by the Puritan faction of the Church of England. Here are three examples of problems the Puritans perceived with the Bishops and Great Bibles:

Instructions were given to the translators that were intended to use Formal Equivalence and limit the Puritan influence on this new translation. The Bishop of London added a qualification that the translators would add no marginal notes (which had been an issue in the Geneva Bible). King James cited two passages in the Geneva translation where he found the marginal notes offensive to the principles of divinely ordained royal supremacy: Exodus 1:19, where the Geneva Bible notes had commended the example of civil disobedience to the Egyptian Pharaoh showed by the  Hebrew midwives, and also II Chronicles 15:16, where the Geneva Bible had criticized King Asa for not having executed his idolatrous 'mother', Queen Maachah (Maachah had actually been Asa's grandmother, but James considered the Geneva Bible reference as sanctioning the execution of his own mother Mary, Queen of Scots). Further, the King gave the translators instructions designed to guarantee that the new version would conform to the ecclesiology of the Church of England. Certain Greek and Hebrew words were to be translated in a manner that reflected the traditional usage of the church. For example, old ecclesiastical words such as the word "church" were to be retained and not to be translated as "congregation". The new translation would reflect the episcopal structure of the Church of England and traditional beliefs about ordained clergy.

James' instructions included several requirements that kept the new translation familiar to its listeners and readers. The text of the Bishops' Bible would serve as the primary guide for the translators, and the familiar proper names of the biblical characters would all be retained. If the Bishops' Bible was deemed problematic in any situation, the translators were permitted to consult other translations from a pre-approved list: the Tyndale Bible, the Coverdale Bible, Matthew's Bible, the Great Bible, and the Geneva Bible. In addition, later scholars have detected an influence on the Authorized Version from the translations of Taverner's Bible and the New Testament of the Douay–Rheims Bible. It is for this reason that the flyleaf of most printings of the Authorized Version observes that the text had been "translated out of the original tongues, and with the former translations diligently compared and revised, by His Majesty's special commandment." As the work proceeded, more detailed rules were adopted as to how variant and uncertain readings in the Hebrew and Greek source texts should be indicated, including the requirement that words supplied in English to 'complete the meaning' of the originals should be printed in a different type face.

The task of translation was undertaken by 47 scholars, although 54 were originally approved. All were members of the Church of England and all except Sir Henry Savile were clergy. The scholars worked in six committees, two based in each of the University of Oxford, the University of Cambridge, and Westminster. The committees included scholars with Puritan sympathies, as well as high churchmen. Forty unbound copies of the 1602 edition of the Bishops' Bible were specially printed so that the agreed changes of each committee could be recorded in the margins. The committees worked on certain parts separately and the drafts produced by each committee were then compared and revised for harmony with each other. The scholars were not paid directly for their translation work; instead, a circular letter was sent to bishops encouraging them to consider the translators for appointment to well-paid livings as these fell vacant. Several were supported by the various colleges at Oxford and Cambridge, while others were promoted to bishoprics, deaneries and prebends through royal patronage.

The committees started work towards the end of 1604. King James VI and I, on 22 July 1604, sent a letter to Archbishop Bancroft asking him to contact all English churchmen requesting that they make donations to his project.

They had all completed their sections by 1608, the Apocrypha committee finishing first. From January 1609, a General Committee of Review met at Stationers' Hall, London to review the completed marked texts from each of the six committees. The General Committee included John Bois, Andrew Downes and John Harmar, and others known only by their initials, including "AL" (who may be Arthur Lake), and were paid for their attendance by the Stationers' Company. John Bois prepared a note of their deliberations (in Latin) – which has partly survived in two later transcripts. Also surviving of the translators' working papers are a bound-together set of marked-up corrections to one of the forty Bishops' Bibles—covering the Old Testament and Gospels, and also a manuscript translation of the text of the Epistles, excepting those verses where no change was being recommended to the readings in the Bishops' Bible. Archbishop Bancroft insisted on having a final say making fourteen further changes, of which one was the term "bishopricke" at Acts 1:20.

Translation committees
 First Westminster Company, translated Genesis to 2 Kings: Lancelot Andrewes, John Overall, Hadrian à Saravia, Richard Clarke, John Layfield, Robert Tighe, Francis Burleigh, Geoffrey King, Richard Thomson, William Bedwell;
 First Cambridge Company, translated 1 Chronicles to the Song of Solomon: Edward Lively, John Richardson, Lawrence Chaderton, Francis Dillingham, Roger Andrewes, Thomas Harrison, Robert Spaulding, Andrew Bing;
 First Oxford Company, translated Isaiah to Malachi: John Harding, John Rainolds (or Reynolds), Thomas Holland, Richard Kilby, Miles Smith, Richard Brett, Daniel Fairclough, William Thorne;
 Second Oxford Company, translated the Gospels, Acts of the Apostles, and the Book of Revelation: Thomas Ravis, George Abbot, Richard Eedes, Giles Tomson, Sir Henry Savile, John Peryn, Ralph Ravens, John Harmar, John Aglionby, Leonard Hutten;
 Second Westminster Company, translated the Epistles: William Barlow, John Spenser, Roger Fenton, Ralph Hutchinson, William Dakins, Michael Rabbet, Thomas Sanderson (who probably had already become Archdeacon of Rochester);
 Second Cambridge Company, translated the Apocrypha: John Duport, William Branthwaite, Jeremiah Radcliffe, Samuel Ward, Andrew Downes, John Bois, Robert Ward, Thomas Bilson, Richard Bancroft.

Printing

The original printing of the Authorized Version was published by Robert Barker, the King's Printer, in 1611 as a complete folio Bible. It was sold looseleaf for ten shillings, or bound for twelve. Robert Barker's father, Christopher, had, in 1589, been granted by Elizabeth I the title of royal Printer, with the perpetual Royal Privilege to print Bibles in England. Robert Barker invested very large sums in printing the new edition, and consequently ran into serious debt, such that he was compelled to sub-lease the privilege to two rival London printers, Bonham Norton and John Bill. It appears that it was initially intended that each printer would print a portion of the text, share printed sheets with the others, and split the proceeds. Bitter financial disputes broke out, as Barker accused Norton and Bill of concealing their profits, while Norton and Bill accused Barker of selling sheets properly due to them as partial Bibles for ready money. There followed decades of continual litigation, and consequent imprisonment for debt for members of the Barker and Norton printing dynasties, while each issued rival editions of the whole Bible. In 1629 the Universities of Oxford and Cambridge successfully managed to assert separate and prior royal licences for Bible printing, for their own university presses—and Cambridge University took the opportunity to print revised editions of the Authorized Version in 1629, and 1638. The editors of these editions included John Bois and John Ward from the original translators. This did not, however, impede the commercial rivalries of the London printers, especially as the Barker family refused to allow any other printers access to the authoritative manuscript of the Authorized Version.

Two editions of the whole Bible are recognized as having been produced in 1611, which may be distinguished by their rendering of Ruth 3:15; the first edition reading "he went into the city", where the second reads "she went into the city"; these are known colloquially as the "He" and "She" Bibles.

The original printing was made before English spelling was standardized, and when printers, as a matter of course, expanded and contracted the spelling of the same words in different places, so as to achieve an even column of text. They set v for initial u and v, and u for u and v everywhere else. They used long ſ for non-final s. The glyph j occurs only after i, as in the final letter in a Roman numeral. Punctuation was relatively heavy and differed from current practice. When space needed to be saved, the printers sometimes used ye for the (replacing the Middle English thorn, Þ, with the continental y), set ã for an or am (in the style of scribe's shorthand), and set & for and. On the contrary, on a few occasions, they appear to have inserted these words when they thought a line needed to be padded. Later printings regularized these spellings; the punctuation has also been standardized, but still varies from current usage norms.

The first printing used a blackletter typeface instead of a roman typeface, which itself made a political and a religious statement. Like the Great Bible and the Bishops' Bible, the Authorized Version was "appointed to be read in churches". It was a large folio volume meant for public use, not private devotion; the weight of the type mirrored the weight of establishment authority behind it. However, smaller editions and roman-type editions followed rapidly, e.g. quarto roman-type editions of the Bible in 1612. This contrasted with the Geneva Bible, which was the first English Bible printed in a roman typeface (although black-letter editions, particularly in folio format, were issued later).

In contrast to the Geneva Bible and the Bishops' Bible, which had both been extensively illustrated, there were no illustrations at all in the 1611 edition of the Authorized Version, the main form of decoration being the historiated initial letters provided for books and chapterstogether with the decorative title pages to the Bible itself, and to the New Testament.

In the Great Bible, readings derived from the Vulgate but not found in published Hebrew and Greek texts had been distinguished by being printed in smaller roman type. In the Geneva Bible, a distinct typeface had instead been applied to distinguish text supplied by translators, or thought needful for English grammar but not present in the Greek or Hebrew; and the original printing of the Authorized Version used roman type for this purpose, albeit sparsely and inconsistently. This results in perhaps the most significant difference between the original printed text of the King James Bible and the current text. When, from the later 17th century onwards, the Authorized Version began to be printed in roman type, the typeface for supplied words was changed to italics, this application being regularized and greatly expanded. This was intended to de-emphasize the words.

The original printing contained two prefatory texts; the first was a formal Epistle Dedicatory to "the most high and mighty Prince" King James. Many British printings reproduce this, while most non-British printings do not.

The second preface was called Translators to the Reader, a long and learned essay that defends the undertaking of the new version. It observes the translators' stated goal, that they "never thought from the beginning that [they] should need to make a new translation, nor yet to make of a bad one a good one, ... but to make a good one better, or out of many good ones, one principal good one, not justly to be excepted against; that hath been our endeavour, that our mark." They also give their opinion of previous English Bible translations, stating, "We do not deny, nay, we affirm and avow, that the very meanest translation of the Bible in English, set forth by men of our profession, (for we have seen none of theirs [Catholics] of the whole Bible as yet) containeth the word of God, nay, is the word of God." As with the first preface, some British printings reproduce this, while most non-British printings do not. Almost every printing that includes the second preface also includes the first.
The first printing contained a number of other apparatus, including a table for the reading of the Psalms at matins and evensong, and a calendar, an almanac, and a table of holy days and observances. Much of this material became obsolete with the adoption of the Gregorian calendar by Britain and its colonies in 1752, and thus modern editions invariably omit it.

So as to make it easier to know a particular passage, each chapter was headed by a brief précis of its contents with verse numbers. Later editors freely substituted their own chapter summaries, or omitted such material entirely. Pilcrow marks are used to indicate the beginnings of paragraphs except after the book of Acts.

Authorized Version
The Authorized Version was meant to replace the Bishops' Bible as the official version for readings in the Church of England. No record of its authorization exists; it was probably effected by an order of the Privy Council, but the records for the years 1600 to 1613 were destroyed by fire in January 1618/19, and it is commonly known as the Authorized Version in the United Kingdom. The King's Printer issued no further editions of the Bishops' Bible, so necessarily the Authorized Version replaced it as the standard lectern Bible in parish church use in England.

In the 1662 Book of Common Prayer, the text of the Authorized Version finally supplanted that of the Great Bible in the Epistle and Gospel readings—though the Prayer Book Psalter nevertheless continues in the Great Bible version.

The case was different in Scotland, where the Geneva Bible had long been the standard church Bible. It was not until 1633 that a Scottish edition of the Authorized Version was printed—in conjunction with the Scots coronation in that year of Charles I. The inclusion of illustrations in the edition raised accusations of Popery from opponents of the religious policies of Charles and William Laud, Archbishop of Canterbury. However, official policy favoured the Authorized Version, and this favour returned during the Commonwealth—as London printers succeeded in re-asserting their monopoly on Bible printing with support from Oliver Cromwell—and the "New Translation" was the only edition on the market. F. F. Bruce reports that the last recorded instance of a Scots parish continuing to use the "Old Translation" (i.e. Geneva) as being in 1674.

The Authorized Versions acceptance by the general public took longer. The Geneva Bible continued to be popular, and large numbers were imported from Amsterdam, where printing continued up to 1644 in editions carrying a false London imprint. However, few if any genuine Geneva editions appear to have been printed in London after 1616, and in 1637 Archbishop Laud prohibited their printing or importation. In the period of the English Civil War, soldiers of the New Model Army were issued a book of Geneva selections called "The Soldiers' Bible". In the first half of the 17th century the Authorized Version is most commonly referred to as "The Bible without notes", thereby distinguishing it from the Geneva "Bible with notes". 

There were several printings of the Authorized Version in Amsterdam—one as late as 1715 which combined the Authorized Version translation text with the Geneva marginal notes; one such edition was printed in London in 1649. During the Commonwealth a commission was established by Parliament to recommend a revision of the Authorized Version with acceptably Protestant explanatory notes, but the project was abandoned when it became clear that these would nearly double the bulk of the Bible text. After the English Restoration, the Geneva Bible was held to be politically suspect and a reminder of the repudiated Puritan era. Furthermore, disputes over the lucrative rights to print the Authorized Version dragged on through the 17th century, so none of the printers involved saw any commercial advantage in marketing a rival translation. The Authorized Version became the only current version circulating among English-speaking people.

A small minority of critical scholars were slow to accept the latest translation. Hugh Broughton, who was the most highly regarded English Hebraist of his time but had been excluded from the panel of translators because of his utterly uncongenial temperament, issued in 1611 a total condemnation of the new version. He especially criticized the translators' rejection of word-for-word equivalence and stated that "he would rather be torn in pieces by wild horses than that this abominable translation (KJV) should ever be foisted upon the English people". Walton's London Polyglot of 1657 disregards the Authorized Version (and indeed the English language) entirely. Walton's reference text throughout is the Vulgate. 

The Vulgate Latin is also found as the standard text of scripture in Thomas Hobbes's Leviathan of 1651, indeed Hobbes gives Vulgate chapter and verse numbers (e.g., Job 41:24, not Job 41:33) for his head text. In Chapter 35: The Signification in Scripture of Kingdom of God, Hobbes discusses Exodus 19:5, first in his own translation of the Vulgar Latin, and then subsequently as found in the versions he terms "... the English translation made in the beginning of the reign of King James", and "The Geneva French" (i.e. Olivétan). Hobbes advances detailed critical arguments why the Vulgate rendering is to be preferred. For most of the 17th century the assumption remained that, while it had been of vital importance to provide the scriptures in the vernacular for ordinary people, nevertheless for those with sufficient education to do so, Biblical study was best undertaken within the international common medium of Latin. It was only in 1700 that modern bilingual Bibles appeared in which the Authorized Version was compared with counterpart Dutch and French Protestant vernacular Bibles.

In consequence of the continual disputes over printing privileges, successive printings of the Authorized Version were notably less careful than the 1611 edition had been—compositors freely varying spelling, capitalization and punctuation—and also, over the years, introducing about 1,500 misprints (some of which, like the omission of "not" from the commandment "Thou shalt not commit adultery" in the "Wicked Bible", became notorious). The two Cambridge editions of 1629 and 1638 attempted to restore the proper text—while introducing over 200 revisions of the original translators' work, chiefly by incorporating into the main text a more literal reading originally presented as a marginal note. A more thoroughly corrected edition was proposed following the Restoration, in conjunction with the revised 1662 Book of Common Prayer, but Parliament then decided against it.

By the first half of the 18th century, the Authorized Version was effectively unchallenged as the sole English translation in current use in Protestant churches, and was so dominant that the Catholic Church in England issued in 1750 a revision of the 1610 Douay–Rheims Bible by Richard Challoner that was very much closer to the Authorized Version than to the original. However, general standards of spelling, punctuation, typesetting, capitalization and grammar had changed radically in the 100 years since the first edition of the Authorized Version, and all printers in the market were introducing continual piecemeal changes to their Bible texts to bring them into line with current practice—and with public expectations of standardized spelling and grammatical construction.

Over the course of the 18th century, the Authorized Version supplanted the Hebrew, Greek and the Latin Vulgate as the standard version of scripture for English speaking scholars and divines, and indeed came to be regarded by some as an inspired text in itself—so much so that any challenge to its readings or textual base came to be regarded by many as an assault on Holy Scripture.

In the 18th century there was a serious shortage of Bibles in the American colonies. To meet the demand various printers, beginning with Samuel Kneeland in 1752, printed the King James Bible without authorization from the Crown. To avert prosecution and detection of an unauthorized printing they would include the royal insignia on the title page, using the same materials in its printing as the authorized version was produced from, which were imported from England.

Standard text of 1769

By the mid-18th century the wide variation in the various modernized printed texts of the Authorized Version, combined with the notorious accumulation of misprints, had reached the proportion of a scandal, and the Universities of Oxford and Cambridge both sought to produce an updated standard text. First of the two was the Cambridge edition of 1760, the culmination of 20 years' work by Francis Sawyer Parris, who died in May of that year. This 1760 edition was reprinted without change in 1762 and in John Baskerville's fine folio edition of 1763. 

This was effectively superseded by the 1769 Oxford edition, edited by Benjamin Blayney, though with comparatively few changes from Parris's edition; but which became the Oxford standard text, and is reproduced almost unchanged in most current printings. Parris and Blayney sought consistently to remove those elements of the 1611 and subsequent editions that they believed were due to the vagaries of printers, while incorporating most of the revised readings of the Cambridge editions of 1629 and 1638, and each also introducing a few improved readings of their own. 

They undertook the mammoth task of standardizing the wide variation in punctuation and spelling of the original, making many thousands of minor changes to the text. In addition, Blayney and Parris thoroughly revised and greatly extended the italicization of "supplied" words not found in the original languages by cross-checking against the presumed source texts. Blayney seems to have worked from the 1550 Stephanus edition of the Textus Receptus, rather than the later editions of Theodore Beza that the translators of the 1611 New Testament had favoured; accordingly the current Oxford standard text alters around a dozen italicizations where Beza and Stephanus differ. Like the 1611 edition, the 1769 Oxford edition included the Apocrypha, although Blayney tended to remove cross-references to the Books of the Apocrypha from the margins of their Old and New Testaments wherever these had been provided by the original translators. It also includes both prefaces from the 1611 edition. Altogether, the standardization of spelling and punctuation caused Blayney's 1769 text to differ from the 1611 text in around 24,000 places.

The 1611 and 1769 texts of the first three verses from I Corinthians 13 are given below.

There are a number of superficial edits in these three verses: 11 changes of spelling, 16 changes of typesetting (including the changed conventions for the use of u and v), three changes of punctuation, and one variant text—where "not charity" is substituted for "no charity" in verse two, in the erroneous belief that the original reading was a misprint.

A particular verse for which Blayney's 1769 text differs from Parris's 1760 version is Matthew 5:13, where Parris (1760) has

For a period, Cambridge continued to issue Bibles using the Parris text, but the market demand for absolute standardization was now such that they eventually adapted Blayney's work but omitted some of the idiosyncratic Oxford spellings. By the mid-19th century, almost all printings of the Authorized Version were derived from the 1769 Oxford text—increasingly without Blayney's variant notes and cross references, and commonly excluding the Apocrypha. One exception to this was a scrupulous original-spelling, page-for-page, and line-for-line reprint of the 1611 edition (including all chapter headings, marginalia, and original italicization, but with Roman type substituted for the black letter of the original), published by Oxford in 1833. 

Another important exception was the 1873 Cambridge Paragraph Bible, thoroughly revised, modernized and re-edited by F. H. A. Scrivener, who for the first time consistently identified the source texts underlying the 1611 translation and its marginal notes. Scrivener, like Blayney, opted to revise the translation where he considered the judgement of the 1611 translators had been faulty. In 2005, Cambridge University Press released its New Cambridge Paragraph Bible with Apocrypha, edited by David Norton, which followed in the spirit of Scrivener's work, attempting to bring spelling to present-day standards. Norton also innovated with the introduction of quotation marks, while returning to a hypothetical 1611 text, so far as possible, to the wording used by its translators, especially in the light of the re-emphasis on some of their draft documents. This text has been issued in paperback by Penguin Books.

From the early 19th century the Authorized Version has remained almost completely unchanged—and since, due to advances in printing technology, it could now be produced in very large editions for mass sale, it established complete dominance in public and ecclesiastical use in the English-speaking Protestant world. Academic debate through that century, however, increasingly reflected concerns about the Authorized Version shared by some scholars: (a) that subsequent study in oriental languages suggested a need to revise the translation of the Hebrew Bible—both in terms of specific vocabulary, and also in distinguishing descriptive terms from proper names; (b) that the Authorized Version was unsatisfactory in translating the same Greek words and phrases into different English, especially where parallel passages are found in the synoptic gospels; and (c) in the light of subsequent ancient manuscript discoveries, the New Testament translation base of the Greek Textus Receptus could no longer be considered to be the best representation of the original text.

Responding to these concerns, the Convocation of Canterbury resolved in 1870 to undertake a revision of the text of the Authorized Version, intending to retain the original text "except where in the judgement of competent scholars such a change is necessary". The resulting revision was issued as the Revised Version in 1881 (New Testament), 1885 (Old Testament) and 1894 (Apocrypha); but, although it sold widely, the revision did not find popular favour, and it was only reluctantly in 1899 that Convocation approved it for reading in churches.

By the early 20th century, editing had been completed in Cambridge's text, with at least 6 new changes since 1769, and the reversing of at least 30 of the standard Oxford readings. The distinct Cambridge text was printed in the millions, and after the Second World War "the unchanging steadiness of the KJB was a huge asset."

Editorial criticism
F. H. A. Scrivener and D. Norton have both written in detail on editorial variations which have occurred through the history of the publishing of the Authorized Version from 1611 to 1769. In the 19th century, there were effectively three main guardians of the text. Norton identified five variations among the Oxford, Cambridge, and London (Eyre and Spottiswoode) texts of 1857, such as the spelling of "farther" or "further" at Matthew 26:39.

In the 20th century, variation between the editions was reduced to comparing the Cambridge to the Oxford. Distinctly identified Cambridge readings included "or Sheba", "sin", "clifts", "vapour", "flieth", "further" and a number of other references. In effect the Cambridge was considered the current text in comparison to the Oxford. These are instances where both Oxford and Cambridge have now diverged from Blayney's 1769 Edition. The distinctions between the Oxford and Cambridge editions have been a major point in the Bible version debate, and a potential theological issue, particularly in regard to the identification of the Pure Cambridge Edition.

Cambridge University Press introduced a change at 1 John 5:8 in 1985, reversing its longstanding tradition of printing the word "spirit" in lower case by using a capital letter "S". A Rev. Hardin of Bedford, Pennsylvania, wrote a letter to Cambridge inquiring about this verse, and received a reply on 3 June 1985 from the Bible Director, Jerry L. Hooper, claiming that it was a "matter of some embarrassment regarding the lower case 's' in Spirit".

Literary attributes

Translation

In obedience to their instructions, the translators provided no marginal interpretation of the text, but in some 8,500 places a marginal note offers an alternative English wording. The majority of these notes offer a more literal rendering of the original, introduced as "Heb", "Chal" (Chaldee, referring to Aramaic), "Gr" or "Lat". Others indicate a variant reading of the source text (introduced by "or"). Some of the annotated variants derive from alternative editions in the original languages, or from variant forms quoted in the fathers. More commonly, though, they indicate a difference between the literal original language reading and that in the translators' preferred recent Latin versions: Tremellius for the Old Testament, Junius for the Apocrypha, and Beza for the New Testament. At thirteen places in the New Testament a marginal note records a variant reading found in some Greek manuscript copies; in almost all cases reproducing a counterpart textual note at the same place in Beza's editions. 

A few more extensive notes clarify Biblical names and units of measurement or currency. Modern reprintings rarely reproduce these annotated variants—although they are to be found in the New Cambridge Paragraph Bible. In addition, there were originally some 9,000 scriptural cross-references, in which one text was related to another. Such cross-references had long been common in Latin Bibles, and most of those in the Authorized Version were copied unaltered from this Latin tradition. Consequently the early editions of the KJV retain many Vulgate verse references—e.g. in the numbering of the Psalms. At the head of each chapter, the translators provided a short précis of its contents, with verse numbers; these are rarely included in complete form in modern editions.

Also in obedience to their instructions, the translators indicated 'supplied' words in a different typeface; but there was no attempt to regularize the instances where this practice had been applied across the different companies; and especially in the New Testament, it was used much less frequently in the 1611 edition than would later be the case. In one verse, 1 John 2:23, an entire clause was printed in roman type (as it had also been in the Great Bible and Bishop's Bible); indicating a reading then primarily derived from the Vulgate, albeit one for which the later editions of Beza had provided a Greek text.

In the Old Testament the translators render the Tetragrammaton (YHWH) by "the LORD" (in later editions in small capitals as ), or "the LORD God" (for YHWH Elohim, יהוה אלהים), except in four places by "IEHOVAH". However, if the Tetragrammaton occurs with the Hebrew word  (Lord) then it is rendered not as the "Lord LORD" but as the "Lord God". In later editions it appears as "Lord ", with "" in small capitals, indicating to the reader that God's name appears in the original Hebrew.

Old Testament
For the Old Testament, the translators used a text originating in the editions of the Hebrew Rabbinic Bible by Daniel Bomberg (1524/5), but adjusted this to conform to the Greek LXX or Latin Vulgate in passages to which Christian tradition had attached a Christological interpretation. For example, the Septuagint reading "They pierced my hands and my feet" was used in Psalm 22:16 (vs. the Masoretes' reading of the Hebrew "like lions my hands and feet"). Otherwise, however, the Authorized Version is closer to the Hebrew tradition than any previous English translation—especially in making use of the rabbinic commentaries, such as Kimhi, in elucidating obscure passages in the Masoretic Text; earlier versions had been more likely to adopt LXX or Vulgate readings in such places. Following the practice of the Geneva Bible, the books of 1 Esdras and 2 Esdras in the medieval Vulgate Old Testament were renamed 'Ezra' and 'Nehemiah'; 3 Esdras and 4 Esdras in the Apocrypha being renamed '1 Esdras' and '2 Esdras'.

New Testament
For the New Testament, the translators chiefly used the 1598 and 1588/89 Greek editions of Theodore Beza, which also present Beza's Latin version of the Greek and Stephanus's edition of the Latin Vulgate. Both of these versions were extensively referred to, as the translators conducted all discussions amongst themselves in Latin. F. H. A. Scrivener identifies 190 readings where the Authorized Version translators depart from Beza's Greek text, generally in maintaining the wording of the Bishops' Bible and other earlier English translations. In about half of these instances, the Authorized Version translators appear to follow the earlier 1550 Greek Textus Receptus of Stephanus. For the other half, Scrivener was usually able to find corresponding Greek readings in the editions of Erasmus, or in the Complutensian Polyglot. However, in several dozen readings he notes that no printed Greek text corresponds to the English of the Authorized Version, which in these places derives directly from the Vulgate. For example, at John 10:16, the Authorized Version reads "one fold" (as did the Bishops' Bible, and the 16th-century vernacular versions produced in Geneva), following the Latin Vulgate "unum ovile", whereas Tyndale had agreed more closely with the Greek, "one flocke" (μία ποίμνη). The Authorized Version New Testament owes much more to the Vulgate than does the Old Testament; still, at least 80% of the text is unaltered from Tyndale's translation.

Apocrypha
Unlike the rest of the Bible, the translators of the Apocrypha identified their source texts in their marginal notes. From these it can be determined that the books of the Apocrypha were translated from the Septuagint—primarily, from the Greek Old Testament column in the Antwerp Polyglot—but with extensive reference to the counterpart Latin Vulgate text, and to Junius's Latin translation. The translators record references to the Sixtine Septuagint of 1587, which is substantially a printing of the Old Testament text from the Codex Vaticanus Graecus 1209, and also to the 1518 Greek Septuagint edition of Aldus Manutius. They had, however, no Greek texts for 2 Esdras, or for the Prayer of Manasses, and Scrivener found that they here used an unidentified Latin manuscript.

Sources
The translators appear to have otherwise made no first-hand study of ancient manuscript sources, even those that—like the Codex Bezae—would have been readily available to them. In addition to all previous English versions (including, and contrary to their instructions, the Rheimish New Testament which in their preface they criticized), they made wide and eclectic use of all printed editions in the original languages then available, including the ancient Syriac New Testament printed with an interlinear Latin gloss in the Antwerp Polyglot of 1573. In the preface the translators acknowledge consulting translations and commentaries in Chaldee, Hebrew, Syrian, Greek, Latin, Spanish, French, Italian, and German.

The translators took the Bishops' Bible as their source text, and where they departed from that in favour of another translation, this was most commonly the Geneva Bible. However, the degree to which readings from the Bishops' Bible survived into final text of the King James Bible varies greatly from company to company, as did the propensity of the King James translators to coin phrases of their own. John Bois's notes of the General Committee of Review show that they discussed readings derived from a wide variety of versions and patristic sources, including explicitly both Henry Savile's 1610 edition of the works of John Chrysostom and the Rheims New Testament, which was the primary source for many of the literal alternative readings provided for the marginal notes.

Variations in recent translations

A number of Bible verses in the King James Version of the New Testament are not found in more recent Bible translations, where these are based on modern critical texts. In the early seventeenth century, the source Greek texts of the New Testament which were used to produce Protestant Bible versions were mainly dependent on manuscripts of the late Byzantine text-type, and they also contained minor variations which became known as the Textus Receptus. With the subsequent identification of much earlier manuscripts, most modern textual scholars value the evidence of manuscripts which belong to the Alexandrian family as better witnesses to the original text of the biblical authors, without giving it, or any family, automatic preference.

Style and criticism
A primary concern of the translators was to produce an appropriate Bible, dignified and resonant in public reading. Although the Authorized Version's written style is an important part of its influence on English, research has found only one verse—Hebrews 13:8—for which translators debated the wording's literary merits. While they stated in the preface that they used stylistic variation, finding multiple English words or verbal forms in places where the original language employed repetition, in practice they also did the opposite; for example, 14 different Hebrew words were translated into the single English word "prince".

In a period of rapid linguistic change the translators avoided contemporary idioms, tending instead towards forms that were already slightly archaic, like verily and it came to pass. The pronouns thou/thee and ye/you are consistently used as singular and plural respectively, even though by this time you was often found as the singular in general English usage, especially when addressing a social superior (as is evidenced, for example, in Shakespeare). For the possessive of the third person pronoun, the word its, first recorded in the Oxford English Dictionary in 1598, is avoided. The older his is usually employed, as for example at Matthew 5:13: "if the salt have lost his savour, wherewith shall it be salted?"; in other places of it, thereof or bare it are found. Another sign of linguistic conservatism is the invariable use of -eth for the third person singular present form of the verb, as at Matthew 2:13: "the Angel of the Lord appeareth to Joseph in a dreame". The rival ending -(e)s, as found in present-day English, was already widely used by this time (for example, it predominates over -eth in the plays of Shakespeare and Marlowe). Furthermore, the translators preferred which to who or whom as the relative pronoun for persons, as in Genesis 13:5: "And Lot also which went with Abram, had flocks and heards, & tents" although who(m) is also found.

The Authorized Version is notably more Latinate than previous English versions, especially the Geneva Bible. This results in part from the academic stylistic preferences of a number of the translators—several of whom admitted to being more comfortable writing in Latin than in English—but was also, in part, a consequence of the royal proscription against explanatory notes. Hence, where the Geneva Bible might use a common English word, and gloss its particular application in a marginal note, the Authorized Version tends rather to prefer a technical term, frequently in Anglicized Latin. Consequently, although the King had instructed the translators to use the Bishops' Bible as a base text, the New Testament in particular owes much stylistically to the Catholic Rheims New Testament, whose translators had also been concerned to find English equivalents for Latin terminology. In addition, the translators of the New Testament books transliterate names found in the Old Testament in their Greek forms rather than in the forms closer to the Old Testament Hebrew (e.g. "Elias" and "Noe" for "Elijah" and "Noah", respectively).

While the Authorized Version remains among the most widely sold, modern critical New Testament translations differ substantially from it in a number of passages, primarily because they rely on source manuscripts not then accessible to (or not then highly regarded by) early-17th-century Biblical scholarship. In the Old Testament, there are also many differences from modern translations that are based not on manuscript differences, but on a different understanding of Ancient Hebrew vocabulary or grammar by the translators. For example, in modern translations it is clear that Job 28:1-11 is referring throughout to mining operations, which is not at all apparent from the text of the Authorized Version.

Mistranslations
The King James Version contains several alleged mistranslations, especially in the Old Testament where the knowledge of Hebrew and cognate languages was uncertain at the time. Among the most commonly cited errors is in the Hebrew of Job and Deuteronomy, where  with the probable meaning of "wild-ox, aurochs", is translated in the KJV as "unicorn"; following in this the Vulgate unicornis and several medieval rabbinic commentators. The translators of the KJV note the alternative rendering, "rhinocerots" in the margin at Isaiah 34:7. On a similar note Martin Luther's German translation had also relied on the Latin Vulgate on this point, consistently translating רֶאֵם using the German word for unicorn, Einhorn. Otherwise, the translators are accused on several occasions to have mistakenly interpreted a Hebrew descriptive phrase as a proper name (or vice versa); as at 2 Samuel 1:18 where 'the Book of Jasher'  properly refers not to a work by an author of that name, but should rather be rendered as "the Book of the Upright" (which was proposed as an alternative reading in a marginal note to the KJV text).

Influence
Despite royal patronage and encouragement, there was never any overt mandate to use the new translation. It was not until 1661 that the Authorized Version replaced the Bishops' Bible in the Epistle and Gospel lessons of the Book of Common Prayer, and it never did replace the older translation in the Psalter. In 1763 The Critical Review complained that "many false interpretations, ambiguous phrases, obsolete words and indelicate expressions ... excite the derision of the scorner". Blayney's 1769 version, with its revised spelling and punctuation, helped change the public perception of the Authorized Version to a masterpiece of the English language. By the 19th century, F. W. Faber could say of the translation, "It lives on the ear, like music that can never be forgotten, like the sound of church bells, which the convert hardly knows how he can forego."

Geddes MacGregor called the Authorized Version "the most influential version of the most influential book in the world, in what is now its most influential language", "the most important book in English religion and culture", and "the most celebrated book in the English-speaking world". David Crystal has estimated that it is responsible for 257 idioms in English; examples include feet of clay and reap the whirlwind. Furthermore, prominent atheist figures such as Christopher Hitchens and Richard Dawkins have praised the King James Version as being "a giant step in the maturing of English literature" and "a great work of literature", respectively, with Dawkins then adding, "A native speaker of English who has never read a word of the King James Bible is verging on the barbarian".

The King James Version is one of the versions authorized to be used in the services of the Episcopal Church and other parts of the Anglican Communion, as it is the historical Bible of this church. 

Other Christian denominations have also accepted the King James Version. The King James Version is used by English-speaking Conservative Anabaptists, along with Methodists of the conservative holiness movement, in addition to certain Baptists. In the Orthodox Church in America, it is used liturgically and was made "the 'official' translation for a whole generation of American Orthodox". The later Service Book of the Antiochian archdiocese, in vogue today, also uses the King James Version. The Church of Jesus Christ of Latter-day Saints continues to use its own edition of the Authorized Version as its official English Bible.

Although the Authorized Version's preeminence in the English-speaking world has diminished—for example, the Church of England recommends six other versions in addition to it—it is still the most used translation in the United States, especially as the Scofield Reference Bible for Evangelicals. However, over the past forty years it has been gradually overtaken by modern versions, principally the New International Version (1973) and the New Revised Standard Version (1989), the latter of which is seen as a successor to the King James Version.

Copyright status
The Authorized Version is in the public domain in most of the world. However, in the United Kingdom, the right to print, publish and distribute it is a royal prerogative and the Crown licenses publishers to reproduce it under letters patent. In England, Wales and Northern Ireland the letters patent are held by the King's Printer, and in Scotland by the Scottish Bible Board. The office of King's Printer has been associated with the right to reproduce the Bible for centuries, the earliest known reference coming in 1577. In the 18th century, all surviving interests in the monopoly were bought out by John Baskett. The Baskett rights descended through a number of printers and, in England, Wales and Northern Ireland, the King's Printer is now Cambridge University Press, which inherited the right when they took over the firm of Eyre & Spottiswoode in 1990.

Other royal charters of similar antiquity grant Cambridge University Press and Oxford University Press the right to produce the Authorized Version independently of the King's Printer. In Scotland, the Authorized Version is published by Collins under licence from the Scottish Bible Board. The terms of the letters patent prohibit any other than the holders, or those authorized by the holders, from printing, publishing or importing the Authorized Version into the United Kingdom. The protection that the Authorized Version, and also the Book of Common Prayer, enjoy is the last remnant of the time when the Crown held a monopoly over all printing and publishing in the United Kingdom. Almost all provisions granting copyright in perpetuity were abolished by the Copyright, Designs and Patents Act 1988, but because the Authorized Version is protected by royal prerogative rather than copyright, it will remain protected, as specified in CDPA s171(1)(b).

Permission 
Within the United Kingdom, Cambridge University Press permits the reproduction of at most 500 verses for "liturgical and non-commercial educational use", provided that their prescribed acknowledgement is included, the quoted verses do not exceed 25% of the publication quoting them and do not include a complete Bible book. For use beyond this, the Press is willing to consider permission requested on a case-by-case basis and in 2011 a spokesman said the Press generally does not charge a fee but tries to ensure that a reputable source text is used.

Apocrypha

Translations of the books of the biblical apocrypha were necessary for the King James version, as readings from these books were included in the daily Old Testament lectionary of the Book of Common Prayer. Protestant Bibles in the 16th century included the books of the Apocrypha—generally, following the Luther Bible, in a separate section between the Old and New Testaments to indicate they were not considered part of the Old Testament text—and there is evidence that these were widely read as popular literature, especially in Puritan circles; The Apocrypha of the King James Version has the same 14 books as had been found in the Apocrypha of the Bishops' Bible; however, following the practice of the Geneva Bible, the first two books of the Apocrypha were renamed 1 Esdras and 2 Esdras, as compared to the names in the Thirty-nine Articles, with the corresponding Old Testament books being renamed Ezra and Nehemiah. Starting in 1630, volumes of the Geneva Bible were occasionally bound with the pages of the Apocrypha section excluded. In 1644 the Long Parliament forbade the reading of the Apocrypha in churches and in 1666 the first editions of the King James Bible without the Apocrypha were bound.

The standardization of the text of the Authorized Version after 1769 together with the technological development of stereotype printing made it possible to produce Bibles in large print-runs at very low unit prices. For commercial and charitable publishers, editions of the Authorized Version without the Apocrypha reduced the cost, while having increased market appeal to non-Anglican Protestant readers.

With the rise of the Bible societies, most editions have omitted the whole section of Apocryphal books. The British and Foreign Bible Society withdrew subsidies for Bible printing and dissemination in 1826, under the following resolution:

The American Bible Society adopted a similar policy. Both societies eventually reversed these policies in light of 20th-century ecumenical efforts on translations, the ABS doing so in 1964 and the BFBS in 1966.

King James Only movement

The King James Only movement advocates the belief that the King James Version is superior to all other English translations of the Bible. Most adherents of the movement believe that the Textus Receptus is very close, if not identical, to the original autographs, thereby making it the ideal Greek source for the translation. They argue that manuscripts such as the Codex Sinaiticus and Codex Vaticanus, on which most modern English translations are based, are corrupted New Testament texts. One of them, Perry Demopoulos, was a director of the translation of the King James Bible into Russian. In 2010 the Russian translation of the KJV of the New Testament was released in Kyiv, Ukraine. In 2017, the first complete edition of a Russian King James Bible was released. In 2017, a Faroese translation of the King James Bible was released as well.

See also

 21st Century King James Version
 Bible errata
 Bible translations
 Charles XII Bible
 Dynamic and formal equivalence
 Modern English Bible translations § King James Versions and derivatives
 New King James Version
 Red letter edition
 Young's Literal Translation

References

Notes

Citations

Works cited

Further reading

Chronological order of publication (newest first)
 Joalland, Michael. "Isaac Newton Reads the King James Version: The Marginal Notes and Reading Marks of a Natural Philosopher." Papers of the Bibliographical Society of America, vol. 113, no. 3 (2019): 297–339.
 Burke, David G., John F. Kutsko, and Philip H. Towner, eds. The King James Version at 400: Assessing Its Genius as Bible Translation and Its Literary Influence (Society of Biblical Literature; 2013) 553 pages; scholars examine such topics as the KJV and 17th-century religious lyric, the KJV and the language of liturgy, and the KJV in Christian Orthodox perspective.
 
   Published to commemorate the 400th anniversary of the initial publication, in 1611, of the Authorized ("King James") Version of the Bible
 
 
  In US: Paperback:
 
  The Diary Of Samuel Ward: A Translator Of The 1611 King James Bible, eds. John Wilson Cowart and M.M. Knappen, contains surviving pages of Samuel Ward's diary from 11 May 1595 to 1 July 1632.
 Ward, Thomas (1903). Errata of the Protestant Bible [i.e. mostly of the Authorized "King James" Version]; or, The Truth of the English Translations Examined, in a Treatise Showing Some of the Errors That Are to Be Found in the English Translations of the Sacred Scriptures, Used by Protestants.  A new ed., carefully rev. and corr., in which are add[itions].  New York: P.J. Kennedy and Sons. N.B.: A polemical Roman Catholic work, first published in the late 17th century.

External links

 The Holy Bible: An Exact Reprint Page for Page of the Authorized Version Published in the Year MDCXI. Oxford: The University Press, 1833, "a scrupulous original-spelling, page-for-page, and line-for-line reprint of the 1611 edition (including all chapter headings, marginalia, and original italicization, but with Roman type substituted for the black letter of the original)" cited in Footnote d above. Complete pdf of the original book.
 The Cambridge Paragraph Bible of the Authorized English Version: With the Text Revised by a Collation of Its Early and Other Principal Editions, the Use of the Italic Type Made Uniform, the Marginal References Remodelled, and a Critical Introduction Prefixed. Cambridge, UK: The University Press, 1873. Complete pdf of the original book.
  Online searchable database of the original 1611 text, including the Apocrypha and introductory text. It also contains the 1769 standard edition.
  On-line image of a page (beginning of St John's gospel) with a written description by the British Library.
  On-line facsimile (page images) of the 1611 printing of the King James Bible, "He" Bible variant.
  On-line facsimile (page images) of the 1611 printing of the King James Bible.
Holy-Bible.online - King James Version
 

 
1611 books
1611 in Christianity
17th-century Christian texts
Anglicanism
Bible translations into English
Church of England
Early printed Bibles
King James Only movement
Latter Day Saint texts
Church of Scotland